Megan Kelly Alexander (born 11 November 1993) is an English footballer who plays as a defender for Coventry United in the FA Women's Championship.  She has previously played for Liverpool,  Oxford United, Everton, Bristol City, Millwall Lionesses and Yeovil Town. Alexander has represented England at under-17 level.

Playing career

Liverpool and Oxford United, 2014 
In June 2014, Alexander was loaned on a three-month deal to Oxford United from Liverpool. Oxford finished in ninth place during the regular season with a  record. Alexander made eight appearances during the regular season. She made two additional appearances during the FA WSL Continental Cup and FA Women's Cup.

Everton, 2015 
In January 2015, Alexander signed with Everton F.C. (women) to complete in the 2015 FA WSL 2. She made four appearances for the club during the regular season. Everton finished in third place with a  record.

Bristol City, 2016–2017 
Alexander signed with Bristol City ahead of the 2016 FA WSL season. Of the signing, Bristol manager Willie Kirk said, "It became apparent quite quickly however, that she was a player that I wanted to work with in the longer term. She is young, enthusiastic, and is hungry to learn and develop. She gives us good options down the left hand side both defensively and attacking and I'm sure that she will be an important player for us this year." Alexander made 15 appearances for the club helping finish in second place with a  record. The team's placement secured promotion back to FA WSL 1 for the 2017–18 FA WSL season.

Yeovil Town, 2018–2019
On 15 August 2018, Alexander signed for FA Women's Super League side Yeovil Town linking up with her former Millwall Lionesses manager Lee Burch.

London Bees, 2019–2021
In August 2019, following Yeovil's relegation to the FA Women's National League South, Alexander once again reunited with manager Lee Burch, this time at FA Women's Championship team London Bees.

International 
Alexander has represented England on the under-17 national team.

References

Further reading 
 Caudwell, Jayne (2011), Women's Football in the UK: Continuing with Gender Analyses, Routledge, 
 Grainey, Timothy (2012), Beyond Bend It Like Beckham: The Global Phenomenon of Women's Soccer, University of Nebraska Press, 
 Scraton, S., Magee, J., Caudwell, J. (2008), Women, Football and Europe: Histories, Equity and Experience (Ifi) (Vol 1), Meyer & Meyer Fachverlag und Buchhandel GmbH, 
 Stewart, Barbara (2012), Women's Soccer: The Passionate Game, Greystone Books, 
 Williams, Jean (2003), A Game for Rough Girls?: A History of Women's Football in Britain, Routledge,

External links 
 England player profile
 Everton player profile
 

1993 births
Living people
Women's Super League players
Liverpool F.C. Women players
Everton F.C. (women) players
Bristol City W.F.C. players
Millwall Lionesses L.F.C. players
Yeovil Town L.F.C. players
English women's footballers
Women's association football defenders
Oxford United W.F.C. players
London Bees players